Stephen Barretto (born 2 March 1989 in Goa) is an Indian footballer who plays as a midfielder for Sporting Clube de Goa in the I-League.

Career

Sporting Goa

Stephen made his debut for Sporting Goa in the I-League on 18 October 2012 against Dempo S.C. at the Fatorda Stadium and in which Sporting Goa lost 5–0 and Stephen came on as a substitute in 81st minute.

Career statistics

Club

References

 http://www.goal.com/en-india/people/india/31959/stephen-barretto

Indian footballers
1989 births
Living people
Footballers from Goa
I-League players
Sporting Clube de Goa players
Association football midfielders